The Secondary Legislation Scrutiny Committee (formerly the Merits of Statutory Instruments Committee) is a select committee of the House of Lords that refers secondary legislation, such as statutory instruments, to the House that it considers interesting or important. This is unlike the Joint Committee on Statutory Instruments and Commons Select Committee on Statutory Instruments, which only scrutinise instruments for legal and drafting defects. The specific criteria used by the committee are whether the legislation—
 is politically or legally important or gives rise to issues of public policy likely to be of interest to the House
 may be inappropriate in view of changed circumstances since the enactment of the parent Act
 may inappropriately implement European Union legislation
 may imperfectly achieve its policy objectives.
The committee adopted its current name on 15 May 2012 principally because of the addition of Public Bodies Orders under the Public Bodies Act 2011.

Due to the number of additional instruments specifically related to Brexit, the committee expanded into two sub-committees from October 2018 until April 2019.

Membership
As of January 2023, the membership of the committee is:

References

External links
 The records of the Merits of Statutory Instruments Committee are held by the UK Parliamentary Archives

Committees of the House of Lords
Statutory Instruments of the United Kingdom